COSCO Beijing is a container ship built in 2006, by Hyundai Heavy Industries Co., Ltd. in South Korea. Beijing is owned by Capetanissa Maritime Corp of Greece, but she is operated by COSCO Container Lines Co Ltd (or known as COSCON).

Hull and engine
She has one oil engine driving 1FP propeller, AuxGen 2 ×  a.c., 3 ×  a.c. The fastest recorded speed on Beijing was

Incidents
On 18 November 2021, the ship was boarded in the Port of Long Beach by the United States Coast Guard and National Transportation Safety Board marine casualty investigators. They were investigating an undersea pipeline that may have been damaged by a ship's anchor and recently spilled oil onto the beaches of Orange County. The ship’s owners, Capetanissa of Liberia and the operator V-Ships Greece Ltd. were designated as parties of interest in the investigation.

References

External links 

2006 ships
Container ships
Ships of COSCO Shipping